Ping An Building may refer to:

 Jiali Plaza in Wuhan
 Ping An Finance Centre in Shenzhen, the fourth tallest building in the world